Commvault is an American publicly traded data protection and data management software company headquartered in Tinton Falls, New Jersey. Commvault enterprise software can be used for data backup and recovery, cloud and infrastructure management, retention and compliance.

History 
Commvault was originally formed in 1988 as a development group in Bell Labs focused on data management, backup, and recovery; it was later designated a business unit of AT&T Network Systems. After becoming a part of Lucent Technologies, the unit was sold in 1996 and became a corporation, with Scotty R. Neal as CEO.

In March 1998, Bob Hammer joined Commvault as chairman, president and CEO, and Al Bunte joined as vice president and COO. In 2000, the company began releasing products aimed at managing network storage. In March 2006, Commvault filed for an initial public offering, and officially went public later that year as CVLT on NASDAQ. At the end of 2013, the company moved from its space in Oceanport, New Jersey, to its new $146 million headquarters at the former Fort Monmouth in Tinton Falls, New Jersey.

On February 5, 2019, Sanjay Mirchandani replaced the retiring Hammer as president and CEO, and Nick Adamo was announced as chairman of the board. Mirchandani joined Commvault from Puppet, an Oregon-based IT automation company, where he served as CEO.

Software 
Commvault software is an enterprise-level data platform that contains modules to back up, restore, archive, replicate, and search data. It is built from the ground-up on a single platform and unified code base. It has four product lines: Complete Backup and Recovery, HyperScale integrated appliances, Orchestrate disaster recovery, and Activate analytics. The software is available across cloud and on-premises environments.

Data is protected by installing agent software on the physical or virtual hosts, which use operating system or application native APIs to protect data in a consistent state. Production data is processed by the agent software on client computers and backed up through a data manager, the MediaAgent, to disk, tape, or cloud storage. All data management activity in the environment is tracked by a centralized server, the CommServ, and can be managed by administrators through a central user interface. End users can access protected data using web browsers and mobile devices.

In 2008, Commvault launched a new remote operations management service for storage management for small and midsize businesses. In 2009, the company's backup software product Simpana version 8 offered the industry's first global embedded software deduplication, allowing users to deduplicate data no matter where it is stored. In 2015, following the release of Simpana version 10, the product was renamed Commvault Software. In 2017, Commvault began to sell its Hyperscale Backup data protection appliances, following up a year later by adding high capacity Hyperscale appliances, and the standalone Remote Office Appliance. Also in 2017, Commvault and Cisco Systems announced ScaleProtect, combining HyperScale software reference architecture with the Cisco Unified Computing System, giving enterprise customers the ability to manage secondary data in a cloud-like, on-premises solution. On July 17, 2018, the company announced a newly packaged set of four products under the name Commvault Complete: Commvault Complete Backup & Recovery, Commvault HyperScale, Commvault Orchestrate, and Commvault Activate. On October 14, 2019, Commvault launched Metallic, a SaaS backup and recovery service for the mid-market, allowing customers to backup on-premises data to their own backup system, their public cloud, Metallic's public cloud, or a combination of both.

Commvault has partnered with companies including Cisco Systems, Hewlett Packard Enterprise, Microsoft, Amazon Web Services, IBM, and Google.

Services 
Commvault provides consulting services for customers. The company advises customers with setting up new data management systems from the architecture design to the implementation and monitoring. In the remote managed service, Commvault manages the software in production for their customers.

Acquisitions 

On 4 September 2019, Commvault announced that it would acquire software-defined storage startup Hedvig, with the acquisition valued at $225 million. The acquisition was completed that October.

On 1 February 2022, Commvault announced that it has acquired Israel based cyber security company TrapX.

See also 
 List of S&P 400 companies

References 

Software companies of the United States
Software companies based in New Jersey
Companies based in Monmouth County, New Jersey
Tinton Falls, New Jersey
Software companies established in 1996
Companies listed on the Nasdaq
Backup software
Data protection
Data management software
Disaster recovery
2006 initial public offerings
1996 establishments in the United States
1996 establishments in New Jersey
Companies established in 1996